Llamp'u (Aymara for soft, fine-grained, Hispanicized spelling Llampu, also named 'Illampu') is a  mountain in the Cordillera Real in the Bolivian Andes. It is located in the La Paz Department, Murillo Province, La Paz Municipality, north of the mountain Tilata. A lake named Warawarani lies at its feet, south of it.

Llamp'u is also the name of the river which originates south of Tilata near the lake Chaku Quta (Chaco Kkota). It flows to the north-east.

References 

Mountains of La Paz Department (Bolivia)